Harry Alfonso Rusan (April 1, 1910 – November 9, 1987) was an American basketball player for the Harlem Globetrotters and a Negro league baseball shortstop in the 1930s.

A native of St. Louis, Missouri, Rusan attended Paul Quinn College. He played professional baseball for the Brooklyn Royal Giants in 1931, and his basketball career with the Harlem Globetrotters spanned from 1933 to 1942. Rusan died in Detroit, Michigan in 1987 at age 77.

References

External links
Baseball statistics and player information from Baseball-Reference Black Baseball Stats and Seamheads

1910 births
1987 deaths
Brooklyn Royal Giants players
Harlem Globetrotters players
African-American basketball players
Baseball shortstops
Baseball players from St. Louis
Basketball players from St. Louis
20th-century African-American sportspeople